Harran Church is a parish church of the Church of Norway in Grong municipality in Trøndelag county, Norway. It is located in the village of Harran. It is the main church for the Harran parish which is part of the Namdal prosti (deanery) in the Diocese of Nidaros. The white, wooden church was built in a long church style in 1874 using plans drawn up by the architect Jacob Wilhelm Nordan. The church seats about 200 people. The church was built to replace the old Gløshaug Church which was getting to be too small and in need of repair. The church was consecrated on 30 September 1874.

Media gallery

See also
List of churches in Nidaros

References

Grong
Churches in Trøndelag
Wooden churches in Norway
19th-century Church of Norway church buildings
Churches completed in 1874
1874 establishments in Norway
Long churches in Norway